Mitcham, Australia may refer to:

 Mitcham, South Australia, a suburb of Adelaide, South Australia
 Mitcham, Victoria, a suburb of Melbourne, Victoria

See also 
 Mitcham (disambiguation)